Anthostomellina is a genus of fungi within the class Sordariomycetes. The relationship of this taxon to other taxa within the class is unknown (incertae sedis).

References

External links
Index Fungorum

Sordariomycetes genera
Sordariomycetes enigmatic taxa